Weightlifting competitions at the 2011 Pan American Games in Guadalajara were held from October 23 to October 27 at the Weightlifting Forum.

Medal summary

Medal table

Men's events

Women's events

Schedule
All times are Central Standard time (UTC-6).

Qualification

The top eighteen teams with the combined scores at the 2009 and 2010 Pan American Championship would qualify athletes, with the teams finishing higher, qualifying more athletes. Mexico as hosts enters a full team for each gender.

Qualification timeline

Summary

References

 
Events at the 2011 Pan American Games
P
2011